Anupallavi is an Indian Tamil-language soap opera that aired Monday through Friday on Sun TV from 26 April 2010 to 20 January 2012 at 12:30PM IST for 450 episodes. Later a show named Muthaaram and replaced and pushed into 12.00PM at 13 December 2011. The show starred Abhishek, Yuvasree, Deepa, Sangeetha and Nithya Ravindran. It was produced by Abhinaya Creations Radha Krishnasamy, director by Mani Barathy and R. Dhandapaany.

Cast

Main cast

 Abhishek as Rajaraman
 Yuvasree as Pallavi
 Deepa as Anu
 Sangeetha as Srinidhi
Nithya Ravindran 
Shobhana 
 Sairam
Divya Nivashini as Jenifer
 T.D. Sundarrajan
 Kathadi Ramamurthy
 M. Bhanumathi
 Sivaji
 Sathya
 Girish Ayyapath
 Murali
 Danush Gopalakrishnan
 Deepak
 Nesan
 Athithiya
 Sridar
 Kamesh
 Panumathy
 Minnal Deepa as Priya

See also
 List of programs broadcast by Sun TV

References

External links
 Official Website 
 Sun TV on YouTube
 Sun TV Network 
 Sun Group 

Sun TV original programming
2010 Tamil-language television series debuts
Tamil-language television shows
Tamil-language musical television series
2012 Tamil-language television series endings